David John Nutt (born 16 April 1951) is an English neuropsychopharmacologist specialising in the research of drugs that affect the brain and conditions such as addiction, anxiety, and sleep. He is the chairman of Drug Science, a non-profit which he founded in 2010 to provide independent, evidence-based information on drugs. Until 2009, he was a professor at the University of Bristol heading their Psychopharmacology Unit. Since then he has been the Edmond J Safra chair in Neuropsychopharmacology at Imperial College London and director of the Neuropsychopharmacology Unit in the Division of Brain Sciences there. Nutt was a member of the Committee on Safety of Medicines, and was President of the European College of Neuropsychopharmacology.

Career summary and research
Nutt completed his secondary education at Bristol Grammar School and then studied medicine at Downing College, Cambridge, graduating in 1972. In 1975, he completed his clinical training at Guy's Hospital.

He worked as a clinical scientist at the Radcliffe Infirmary from 1978 to 1982 where he carried out basic research into the function of the benzodiazepine receptor/GABA ionophore complex, the long-term effects of BZ agonist treatment and kindling with BZ partial inverse agonists. This work culminated in a ground-breaking paper in Nature in 1982 which described the concept of inverse agonism (using his preferred term, "contragonism") for the first time. From 1983 to 1985, he lectured in psychiatry at the University of Oxford. In 1986, he was the Fogarty visiting scientist at the National Institute on Alcohol Abuse and Alcoholism in Bethesda, MD, outside Washington, D.C. Returning to the UK in 1988, he joined the University of Bristol as director of the Psychopharmacology Unit. In 2009, he then established the Department of Neuropsychopharmacology and Molecular Imaging at Imperial College, London, taking a new chair endowed by the Edmond J Safra Philanthropic Foundation. He is an editor of the Journal of Psychopharmacology, and in 2014 was elected president of the European Brain Council.

In 2007 Nutt published a controversial study on the harms of drug use in The Lancet. Eventually, this led to his dismissal from his position in the Advisory Council on the Misuse of Drugs (ACMD); see government positions below. Subsequently, Nutt and a number of his colleagues who had subsequently resigned from the ACMD founded the Independent Scientific Committee on Drugs, which was later re-named Drug Science.

Through Drug Science, Nutt has released a number of prominent drug policy reports while launching campaigns in support of evidence-based drug policy. These include Project Twenty21, the Medical Cannabis Working Group, and the Medical Psychedelics Working Group. In 2013, Drug Science launched the peer-reviewed Journal of Drug Science, Policy and Law, with Nutt appointed as Editor. Nutt also hosts the Drug Science Podcast, where he explores drugs and drug policy with drug policy experts, policy-makers, and scientists.

Nutt is the deputy head of the Centre for Psychedelic Research at Imperial College London. He and his team have published research into psilocybin for treatment-resistant depression, as well as neuroimaging studies investigating psilocybin, MDMA, LSD, and DMT.

In November 2010, Nutt published another study in The Lancet, co-authored with Les King and Lawrence Phillips on behalf of this independent Committee. This ranked the harm done to users and society by a range of drugs. Owing in part to criticism over the arbitrary weighting of the factors in the 2007 study, the new study employed a multiple-criteria decision analysis procedure and found that alcohol is more harmful to society than both heroin and crack, while heroin, crack, and methamphetamine are the most harmful drugs to individuals. Nutt has also written about this topic in newspapers for the general public, sometimes leading to public disagreements with other researchers.

Nutt is also campaigning for a change in UK drug laws to allow for more research opportunities.

Alcarelle & GABA Labs
Starting in around 2014, Nutt began talking about bringing to market a compound that could mimic some of the effects of alcohol (ethanol)primarily "conviviality"in humans (impacting the GABA receptor) while avoiding the negative health impacts of alcohol; a safer replacement. He calls it "Alcarelle", but does not disclose the exact chemical(s). Early tests used a benzodiazepine derivative, with later adaptations targeting improved efficacy and reduced abuse potential.

In 2018 Nutt's company GABALabs (previously called "Alcarelle") applied for patents for a series of new compounds, branded as Alcarelle, that more closely mimic the "conviviality" effects of alcohol. As of October 2019, none of these compounds were available to consumers, their long-term health impacts were not known and there has been no published research about them.

The science team at GABA Labs has produced a botanical ingredient which was released to the market in the form of the drink Sentia in January 2021 as a "botanical spirit".

Psychedelics

In collaboration with Amanda Feilding and the Beckley Foundation, David Nutt is working on the effects of psychedelics on cerebral blood flow.

Government positions
Nutt worked as an advisor to the Ministry of Defence, Department of Health, and the Home Office.

He served on the Committee on Safety of Medicines where he participated in an enquiry into the use of SSRI anti-depressants in 2003. His participation was criticised as, owing to his financial interest in GlaxoSmithKline, he had to withdraw from discussions of the drug paroxetine. In January 2008 he was appointed as the chairman of the Advisory Council on the Misuse of Drugs (ACMD), having previously been Chair of the Technical Committee of the ACMD for seven years.

"Equasy" 

As ACMD chairman Nutt repeatedly clashed with government ministers over issues of drug harm and classification. In January 2009 he published in the Journal of Psychopharmacology an editorial ("Equasy – An overlooked addiction with implications for the current debate on drug harms") in which the risks associated with horse riding (1 serious adverse event every ~350 exposures) were compared to those of taking ecstasy (1 serious adverse event every ~10,000 exposures).

The word equasy is a portmanteau of ecstasy and equestrianism (based on Latin , 'horse'). Nutt told The Daily Telegraph that his intention was "to get people to understand that drug harm can be equal to harms in other parts of life". In 2012, he explained to the UK Home Affairs Committee that he chose riding as the "pseudo-drug" in his comparison after being consulted by a patient with irreversible brain damage caused by a fall from a horse. He discovered that riding was "considerably more dangerous than [he] had thought ... popular but dangerous" and "something ... that young people do".

In February 2009 he was criticised by Home Secretary Jacqui Smith for stating in the paper that the drug ecstasy was statistically no more dangerous than an addiction to horse-riding.

Equasy has been frequently referred to in later discussions of drug harmfulness and drug policies.

The issue of the mismatch between lawmakers' classification of recreational drugs, in particular that of cannabis, and scientific measures of their harmfulness surfaced again in October 2009, after the publication of a pamphlet containing a lecture Nutt had given to the Centre for Crime and Justice Studies at King's College London in July 2009. In this, Nutt repeated his view that illicit drugs should be classified according to the actual evidence of the harm they cause, and presented an analysis in which nine 'parameters of harm' (grouped as 'physical harm', 'dependence', and 'social harms') revealed that alcohol or tobacco were more harmful than LSD, ecstasy or cannabis. In this ranking, alcohol came fifth behind heroin, cocaine, barbiturates and methadone, and tobacco ranked ninth, ahead of cannabis, LSD and ecstasy, he said. In this classification, alcohol and tobacco appeared as Class B drugs, and cannabis was placed at the top of Class C. Nutt also argued that taking cannabis created only a "relatively small risk" of psychotic illness, and that "the obscenity of hunting down low-level cannabis users to protect them is beyond absurd". Nutt objected to the recent re-upgrading (after 5 years) of cannabis from a Class C drug back to a Class B drug (and thus again on a par with amphetamines), considering it politically motivated rather than scientifically justified. In October 2009 Nutt had a public disagreement with psychiatrist Robin Murray in the pages of The Guardian about the dangers of cannabis in triggering psychosis.

Dismissal
Following the release of this pamphlet, Nutt was dismissed from his ACMD position by the Home Secretary, Alan Johnson. Explaining his dismissal of Nutt, Alan Johnson wrote in a letter to The Guardian, that "He was asked to go because he cannot be both a government adviser and a campaigner against government policy. [...] As for his comments about horse riding being more dangerous than ecstasy, which you quote with such reverence, it is of course a political rather than a scientific point." Responding in The Times, Professor Nutt said: "I gave a lecture on the assessment of drug harms and how these relate to the legislation controlling drugs. According to Alan Johnson, the Home Secretary, some contents of this lecture meant I had crossed the line from science to policy and so he sacked me. I do not know which comments were beyond the line or, indeed, where the line was [...]". He maintains that "the ACMD was supposed to give advice on policy".

In the wake of Nutt's dismissal, Dr Les King, a part-time advisor to the Department of Health, and the senior chemist on the ACMD, resigned from the body. His resignation was soon followed by that of Marion Walker, Clinical Director of Berkshire Healthcare NHS Foundation Trust's substance misuse service, and the Royal Pharmaceutical Society's representative on the ACMD.

The Guardian revealed that Alan Johnson ordered what was described as a 'snap review' of the 40-strong ACMD in October 2009. This, it was said, would assess whether the body is "discharging the functions" that it was set up to deliver and decide if it still represented value for money for the public. The review was to be conducted by David Omand. Within hours of that announcement, an article was published online by The Times arguing that Nutt's controversial lecture actually conformed to government guidelines throughout. This issue was further publicised a week later when Liberal Democrat science spokesman Dr Evan Harris, MP, attacked the Home Secretary for apparently having misled Parliament and the country in his original statement about Nutt's dismissal.

John Beddington, the Chief Scientific Adviser to the UK Government stated that he agreed with the views of Professor Nutt on cannabis. When asked if he agreed whether cannabis was less harmful than cigarettes and alcohol, he replied: "I think the scientific evidence is absolutely clear cut. I would agree with it." A few days later, it was revealed that a leaked email from the government's Science Minister Lord Drayson was quoted as saying Mr Johnson's decision to dismiss Nutt without consulting him was a "big mistake" that left him "pretty appalled".

On 4 November, the BBC reported that Nutt had financial backing to create a new independent drug research body if the ACMD was disbanded or proved incapable of functioning. This new body, the Independent Scientific Committee on Drugs (later re-named DrugScience), was launched in January 2010 (later on to establish, in 2013, the journal Drug Science, Policy and Law). On 11 November 2010, after a meeting between ACMD and Alan Johnson, three other scientists tendered their resignations, Dr Simon Campbell, a chemist, psychologist Dr John Marsden and scientific consultant Ian Ragan.

In an 11 November 2009 editorial in The Lancet, Nutt explicitly attributed his dismissal to a conflict between government and science, and reiterated that "I have repeatedly stated [cannabis] is not safe, but that the idea that you can reduce use through raising the classification in the Misuse of Drugs Act from class C to class B—where it had previously been placed, but thus now increasing the maximum penalty for possession for personal use to 5 years in prison—is implausible." In a rejoinder, William Cullerne Bown of Research Fortnight pointed out that the framing of science vs. government was misleading because the weighting of the factors in Nutt's 2007 Lancet paper was arbitrary, and consequently that there was no scientific answer to ranking drugs. In reply, Nutt admitted the limitations of the original study, and wrote that ACMD was in the process of devising a multicriteria decision-making approach when he was dismissed. Nutt reiterated that "The repeated claims by Gordon Brown's government that it had scientific evidence that trumped that of the ACMD and the acknowledgment that it was only interested in scientific evidence that supported its political aims was a cynical misuse of scientific evidence that breached the principles of the 1971 Act and was insulting to Council." Nutt announced that he and number of colleagues that had resigned from the ACMD had set up an Independent Scientific Committee on Drugs.

A subsequent review of policy drafted by Lord Drayson essentially reaffirmed that the scientific advisers to the government can be dismissed under similar circumstances: "Government and its scientific advisers should not act to undermine mutual trust." This clause was kept despite protest from Sense about Science, Campaign for Science and Engineering, and Liberal Democrat MP Evan Harris; according to Lord Drayson, the clause was requested by John Beddington, the Chief Scientific Adviser to the UK Government. Les Iversen was announced as the successor of Nutt as the chair of the ACMD in January 2010.

Honours
David Nutt is a Fellow of the Royal College of Physicians, Royal College of Psychiatrists and the Academy of Medical Sciences. He holds visiting professorships in Australia, New Zealand and the Netherlands. He is a past president of the British Association of Psychopharmacology and of the European College of Neuropsychopharmacology. He was the recipient of the 2013 John Maddox Prize for promoting sound science and evidence on a matter of public interest, whilst facing difficulty or hostility in doing so. He is past president of the British Neuroscience Association and past president of the European Brain Council.

His book Drugs Without the Hot Air (UIT press) won the Salon London Transmission Prize in 2014.

Personal life 

David Nutt lives in Bristol, with his wife Dianne. He has four children.

Nutt is a Patron of My Death My Decision, an organisation which seeks a more compassionate approach to dying in the UK, including the legal right to a medically-assisted death, if that is a person's persistent wish.

Publications

Articles

Books

 David J. Nutt (2021). Nutt Uncut. Waterside Press.
 David J. Nutt (2021). Brain and Mind Made Simple. Waterside Press.
 David J. Nutt (2022). Cannabis (seeing through the smoke): The New Science of Cannabis and Your Health. Yellow Kite.

Medical and science
Pharmacotherapy
 1st ed(2001):.
 1st ed(1999):.

Brain science

Addiction and associated disorder

Anxiety disorders

 1st ed(1998):

Other disorders
 1st ed(2004):.

 1st(2000):.

Sleep and connected disorder

 (PMC link is a 2-page book review)

References

External links
University profile

David Nutt's blog (previous blog)
Profile on David Nutt in Science. The dangerous professor. Science, 31 January 2014, 343, 478-81.

Academics of Imperial College London
Academics of the University of Bristol
Alumni of Downing College, Cambridge
British psychiatrists
British drug policy reform activists
Living people
Neurochemists
People educated at Bristol Grammar School
1951 births
Scientists from Bristol
John Maddox Prize recipients